Lokavci is a dispersed settlement in the Municipality of Gornja Radgona in northeastern Slovenia.

References

External links
Lokavci on Geopedia

Populated places in the Municipality of Gornja Radgona